Robert Lindstedt and Horia Tecău were the three-time defending champions, but chose not to compete together.  Tecău teamed up with Marius Copil, but they lost in the first round to Jan Hájek and Filip Polášek. Lindstedt played alongside Daniel Nestor, but they lost in the second round to Nicholas Monroe and Simon Stadler. 
Monroe and Stadler went on to win the title, defeating Carlos Berlocq and Albert Ramos in the final, 6–2, 3–6, [10–3]

Seeds

Draw

Draw

External Links
 Main Draw

Swedish Open - Doubles
2013 Doubles